The 2023 Chicago Fire FC season is the club's 28th year of existence, as well as their 26th in Major League Soccer.

Current squad 
Players signed as of March 15, 2023

Player movement

Returning, options, and new contracts

In

Loaned In

Out

Second team movement

Unsigned draft picks and trialists 

Additionally, Fire II defender Charlie Ostrem and goalkeeper Mihajlo Mišković trained with the Fire during preseason.

Technical staff

Competitions

Major League Soccer

Eastern Conference table

Overall table

Results summary

Match results

Preseason

Regular season

Leagues Cup

Central 2

U.S. Open Cup

Statistics 
Note: italics indicates a player who left during the season

Games played

Main starting XI 
This starting group is based on players who started in the indicated position more than any other player across all competitions.
4-2-3-1

4-2-3-1

Goalkeeping

Goals and assists

Disciplinary record

Awards

Man of the Match awards

MLS Team of the Week

Second team statistics

Games played

Goalkeeping

Goals and assists

National team callups 
Note: Italics indicates a player who left midseason

Notes 
</onlyinclude>

References

External links 
 

Chicago Fire FC seasons
Chicago Fire Soccer Club
Chicago Fire